The St. Nicholas Hotel, originally called the Claim House, was located near 12th and Jackson Streets in present-day downtown Omaha, Nebraska. It was the first building in Omaha, the first hotel, and hosted the first church service in Omaha. The Omaha Claim Club met in the building regularly, as well.

History
The Council Bluffs and Nebraska Ferry Company built the Claim House to encourage settlers to use their ferry. The first operators of the building, William and Rachel Snowden, named it the St. Nicholas Hotel and ran it during the  summer and fall of 1854.  The first church service in Omaha was held by Reverend Peter Cooper of neighboring Council Bluffs, Iowa on August 13, 1854.

A log cabin, the St. Nicholas Hotel consisted of one main room and an attached kitchen. Travelers and early settlers found temporary residence there, along with church services, dances and public meetings.

See also
 History of Omaha, Nebraska

References

Defunct hotels in Omaha, Nebraska
Pioneer history of Omaha, Nebraska
Hotel buildings completed in 1854
History of Downtown Omaha, Nebraska
1854 establishments in Nebraska Territory